United Nations Security Council resolution 694, adopted unanimously on 24 May 1991, after reaffirming Resolution 681 (1990) and learning of the deportation of four Palestinians by Israel in the occupied territories on 18 May 1991, the Council condemned the deportations that were in violation of the Fourth Geneva Convention referring to the protection of civilians in times of war.

The resolution deplored the action and reiterated that Israel should refrain from deporting any more Palestinians and ensure the safe and immediate return of those deported.

See also
 Arab–Israeli conflict
 First Intifada
 Israeli–Palestinian conflict
 List of United Nations Security Council Resolutions 601 to 700 (1987–1991)

References
Text of the Resolution at undocs.org

External links
 

 0694
 0694
Israeli–Palestinian conflict and the United Nations
May 1991 events